The Beach is a 1996 novel by English author Alex Garland. Set in Thailand, it is the story of a young backpacker's search for a legendary, idyllic and isolated beach untouched by tourism, and his time there in its small, international community of backpackers.

In 2000, it was adapted into  a film directed by Danny Boyle and starring Leonardo DiCaprio, Virginie Ledoyen and Guillaume Canet. In 2003, the novel was listed on the BBC's survey The Big Read.

Plot summary
Richard, a British backpacker meets a mentally disturbed Scot going by the alias of Daffy Duck at a hotel in Bangkok. Daffy tells Richard about a beautiful island with a hidden lagoon and beach, located in the Gulf of Thailand, where he settled years prior. The beach is inaccessible to tourists and can only be located by a map, which Daffy leaves for Richard. Shortly thereafter, Daffy commits suicide. Wanting company in his search, Richard befriends a travelling French couple, Étienne and Françoise, and the trio sets out to find what they hope might be an untouched paradise.

On their way to the island, Richard gives a copy of the map to Sammy and Zeph, two Americans he meets on Koh Samui. When the three finally reach the hidden beach — after bribing a local boat pilot, swimming from an adjacent island, discovering a cannabis plantation in the jungle, avoiding its armed owners, and jumping over a waterfall — they discover a group of approximately 30 backpackers who have shut off the outside world to live a slow-paced life of leisure under the de facto leadership of an American woman called Sal and her South African lover Bugs, who, along with Daffy, founded the community. They reside in hand-built wooden huts and tents, located near a large, beautiful beach and lagoon that are encircled by cliffs and connected to the sea by underwater caves.

Richard, Étienne, and Françoise arrive in 1995, six years after the founders came to the beach. The founders have chosen only a small number of friends and acquaintances to come to the island, and thus newcomers are not welcome, but they are not sent away because doing so would jeopardize the secrecy of the community. The residents fear that if word gets out, the beach will become overrun with tourists and ruined, like many of Thailand's other beauty spots. They are also mindful of upsetting the Thai cannabis farmers, with whom they originally agreed to keep to separate territories but who have more recently warned them not to bring anyone new to the island, fearing discovery by the police. After initial suspicion, the group accepts the trio when they explain about Daffy's map and his death back on the mainland.

As the community aims to be self-sufficient, work is divided into rosters for gardening, fishing, cooking, and carpentry. Richard, Françoise, and Étienne become part of the fishing detail.

For several months, Richard finds life on the island idyllic, fishing in the mornings and relaxing the rest of the time. He befriends a few other members of the community, like Keaty, a fellow Englishman hooked on his Game Boy; Unhygienix, the Italian head chef obsessed with soap; Jesse and Cassie, two lovers; and Jed, the loner of the group. Sal has assigned Jed to be the island's guardian: He watches the sea and shores of neighboring islands for any signs of people attempting to discover the beach. Jed also has a sideline of stealing cannabis from the Thai farmers' side of the island.

One day, Unhygienix informs everyone that their rice supply has been infected by a fungus, and Sal announces an emergency rice run — an occasional discreet trip to the mainland by boat to bulk-buy rice and other essentials. Due to the laborious nature of the task, no one volunteers but Jed, who, to the bewilderment of most others, always takes the job.

Richard also volunteers, and so the two travel back to Koh Phangan for their supplies. It is during the rice run that Jed learns that Richard gave a copy of the map to Sammy and Zeph, when he coincidentally overhears the two Americans relaying the urban legend of the beach to some Germans.

The rice run goes without a hitch. Meanwhile, accompanied by three Germans, Zeph and Sammy make their way to the nearest island to the beach. Soon afterward, Sal reassigns Richard to the perimeter detail to partner with Jed and keep a close eye on the potential invaders.

Keaty takes Richard's place in the fishing detail. A few days later, he mistakenly catches a dead squid that gives severe food poisoning to most of the group. The few remaining healthy members struggle to nurse the sick residents back to health.

Richard returns from his sentry duty to find that Bugs has punched Keaty in the face for his mistake. Richard, having never liked Bugs' arrogant nature, instigates a heated argument with him in front of the whole group, which leads to a division of the community into several cliques. On this day, only two of the fishing details are still in operation, and the best detail, comprising three Swedes — Christo, Sten, and Karl — who fish outside the safe lagoon area, is attacked by a shark.

Karl survives unharmed and manages to carry Sten to the village, where Sten is discovered to have already bled to death. Suffering severe emotional trauma from this incident, Karl subsequently spends his time sitting in a dug-out hole on the beach and not talking to anyone, barely accepting food and water.

Richard realizes that Christo is still missing and, at his own risk, retrieves him from partially submerged caves of the lagoon and is praised for his heroic rescue. Christo at first seems fine but later collapses, owing to the internal bleeding from the shark attack. Being the only one with medical knowledge to tend to Christo, Jed leaves Richard to work the sentry detail alone.

A few days later, a funeral is held for Sten, and Sal gives a speech that somewhat restores social harmony.

Spending long hours alone in the forest as he hikes between lookout spots, Richard begins to experience hallucinations in which Daffy appears: They converse and patrol together the part of the island that Richard refers to as the DMZ. Richard comes to appreciate that Daffy killed himself because he could neither endure the unravelling of his elitist vision of the beach as the group grew in size, nor bear the thought of a return to either backpacking or settled life, and notes that he is also falling prey to that way of thinking.

Richard realizes the reason why Daffy gave him the map — as well as spread rumors of the island all over Thailand — so that many travelers would come looking for the beach, inevitably leading to its becoming a tourist destination and the end of the community. Richard was merely a pawn in Daffy's revenge plan.

This comes to a head following the arrival of the American/German group by raft. Unlike Richard, Étienne, and Françoise, who managed to overcome all obstacles in getting to the beach, the newcomers never make it past the cannabis farmers. The intruders are beaten violently and killed.

Richard returns to the community campsite to inform Sal and Jed of what happened. He then goes to the beach to visit Karl, who attacks Richard, provoking Richard to attack him before he gets free and runs off into the jungle. One day, while celebrating the Tet festival, Sal obliquely asks Richard to kill Karl because of the threat he poses to the group's now-fragile social integrity, complaining that she constantly has to lift morale in the wake of the poisoning incident and Sten's death.

Richard swims out to the cave where the group's only boat is kept, only to find that Karl has used it to escape to the mainland. Étienne corners Richard thereafter, and he soon discovers that she, along with the rest of his clique, has become frightened of Richard's "doing things" for Sal. Disillusioned with the beach, Richard convinces Étienne, Françoise, Jed, and a paranoid Keaty to leave the beach for good, and euthanizes the dying Christo. Now fully aware of what Sal is willing to do to protect the beach, they decide to spike the food for the Tet celebration and escape on the raft that the doomed backpackers used.

Night falls, and the party begins. Prior to dinner, Keaty and Richard spike the stew that Unhygienix cooked with a lot of cannabis to immobilize the group. Richard and his friends are about to slip away when the cannabis farmers arrive, threatening all of them with guns, as they believe that the beach dwellers invited the recent arrivals. The farmers beat up Richard and leave the bloodied corpses of the American/German backpackers as a warning. At the sight of this, the extremely intoxicated group experiences a collective mental breakdown and starts to rip the corpses apart in a frenzy.

Sal discovers that Richard has spread the secret of the beach when she picks up the map he drew for Zeph and Sammy. Upon hearing this, the now unstable community members attack Richard. He is saved, however, when Françoise, Étienne, Keaty, and Jed return from the beach armed with fishing spears  seriously wounding Sal and Bugs in the process. Richard and his rescuers make their planned escape on the raft.

In the epilogue, it is revealed that the five friends got away and split up when they reached the mainland. It has been a year and one month since their departure from Thailand, and Richard has returned home to England. He hasn't heard from Françoise and Étienne, but states he is likely to bump into them eventually, because "the world is a small place, and Europe is even smaller". He still maintains contact with Keaty and Jed. By chance, Keaty and Jed end up working new jobs in the same building, although for different companies; similar to how they both happened to stay in the same guest house years before they first met at the beach.

Richard hears in a news report that Cassie has been arrested in Malaysia for smuggling a large amount of heroin and will be the first Westerner to be executed in the country in six years. He wonders whether anyone else got off the island, particularly Unhygienix, whom he liked. He believes that Bugs died and hopes that Sal died too, because he dislikes the idea of her "turning up on his doorstep".

Richard finishes by saying that he is content with his life, although he carries a lot of scars: "I like the way that sounds.

Characters

Main characters
 Richard – a young English traveller and the main narrator of the novel. 
 Daffy (Mister Duck) – A Scottish traveller and one of the three original founders of the beach; appears as a mental apparition in Richard's consciousness in the later parts of the novel after his suicide.
 Étienne and Françoise – both French; two young lovers who befriended Richard during their initial encounter in Bangkok, and subsequently join him in searching for the beach after Richard shows them the map.
 Keaty – English; becomes close friends with Richard, and shares a Game Boy addiction. Invited by Sal and Bugs to the beach after they enjoy going on a jungle trek with him over the Burmese border.
 Jed – English; becomes close friends with Richard, and is the island's watchman. Turned up on the beach without a personal invitation, having overheard a rumor of the island while traveling in Vientiane. Daffy is the sole person in the community completely against his uninvited arrival.
 Sal – American; one of the three original founders of the beach, and the unofficial leader of the community.

Other characters
 Zeph and Sammy – The two stoner Americans to whom Richard leaves a copy of the map to the beach. 
 Bugs – South African; Sal's boyfriend, one of the three original founders of the beach, and the community's head carpenter; has a mutual dislike with Richard.
 Gregorio – Spanish; member of Richard's fishing detail. Invited by Daffy to the beach after a robbing incident in Sumatra.
 Unhygienix – Italian; the community's head chef and is friends with Richard. Invited by Bugs to the beach after cooking him an excellent meal in Srinagar.
 Ella –  Works in the cooking detail next to Unhygienix. Invited by Sal to the beach after bonding over a backgammon game whilst on an eighteen-hour bus ride together.
 Jean – French; leader of the gardening detail. Invited by Bugs to the beach after working together picking grapes from a vineyard in Blenheim.
 Cassie – English; girlfriend of Jesse; works with Bugs in the carpentry detail.
 Jesse – New Zealander; boyfriend of Cassie, and works with Jean in the gardening detail.
 Moshe – Israeli; head of the second fishing detail. Invited by Daffy to the beach after catching a street thief attempting to steal his backpack in Manila.
 The Yugoslavian Girls – Two unnamed females from Sarajevo in which Richard comments their names are hard to spell out or even pronounce, and are thus dubbed as the Yugo Girls. He gets the impression that they are haughty and aloof, and never gets to know them very well. They work with Moshe exclusively in the second fishing detail, as Sal regrets inviting them to the beach seeing as they aren't capable of doing anything else.
 Karl, Sten, and Christo (The Swedes) – all Swedish; Considered the best fishing detail since only they are comfortable with swimming through the submerged caves to fish in the open water. Only Sten is fluent in English, with Christo having fair knowledge, and Karl knowing only a few words. Like Jed, the Swedes arrived uninvited, as they learned of the beach's existence after overhearing Sal discussing with Jean about the island during a Rice Run.
 The cannabis farmers – A small group of Thai farmers armed with assault rifles, who live in and maintain a large illegal cannabis field on the far side of the island, presumably exporting it to the mainland for sale. They've been on the island longer than the backpackers, but Sal, Daffy and Bugs came to an agreement with them early in the community's history. Part of Jed's and later Richard's job is to periodically sneak into their field and steal cannabis off the plants for the village's supply. When Richard is assigned to watch duty alone, he takes to stalking the guards through the jungle simply for the thrill.

Influences 

Although set in Thailand, Garland wrote the book while living in the Philippines and, in particular, was inspired by similar geography on the island of Palawan.

Maya Bay in Phi Phi was used as the location of the beach in the movie but the actual inspiration for the book is rumoured to be Haad Tien on Koh Phangan, in the Gulf of Thailand, specifically the hippy community that started up in 1990 - the year the book is set - and evolved into The Sanctuary resort.

Reception
Novelist Nick Hornby referred to The Beach as "a Lord of the Flies for Generation X", and the Sunday Oregonian called it "Generation X's first great novel". The Washington Post wrote that it is "a furiously intelligent first novel" and "a book that moves with the kind of speed and grace many older writers can only day-dream about." Publishers Weekly wrote that "Garland is a good storyteller, though, and Richard's nicotine-fueled narrative of how the denizens of the beach see their comity shatter and break into factions is taut with suspense, even if the bloody conclusion offers few surprises".

Film adaptation
The Beach was adapted as a film released in 2000, directed by Danny Boyle, and starring Leonardo DiCaprio, Tilda Swinton, Robert Carlyle, Virginie Ledoyen, and Guillaume Canet.

See also

 Lord of the Flies (novel)
 Tourism in literature

References 

Novels by Alex Garland
British novels adapted into films
Novels set in Thailand
1996 British novels
Novels set on islands
1996 debut novels
Viking Press books